Idaea laevigata, the strange wave, is a moth of the family Geometridae. It is found in Central Europe and Southern Europe. It occurs in Britain as an imported species.

The species has a wingspan . The adults fly in two generations in June and July and again in September.

The larvae feed on dry plant material.

External links

Strange wave at UK Moths
Fauna Europaea
Lepiforum.de

Sterrhini
Moths of Europe
Moths described in 1763
Taxa named by Giovanni Antonio Scopoli